"Bean Pháidín" (Paidin's wife) is an Irish folk song. The song takes the point of view from a jealous and angry woman who yearns to be married to "Paidin" who already has a wife. The song is known for containing some rather harsh lyrical content as it portrays the hatred that the narrator has towards the other woman. The song started in the Sean-nós genre. Joe Heaney was known to have sung the song in a medley. Celtic Woman's version contains partial English lyrics.

Notable recordings

Planxty - The Well Below the Valley (1973)

Lasairfhíona Ní Chonaola- An Raicín Álainn (2002)

Celtic Woman- Destiny (2016)

Orla Fallon- Lore (2020)

John Spillane- Irish songs we learned at school (2008)

References

External links
https://www.omniglot.com/songs/irish/beanphaidin.php
https://songsinirish.com/bean-phaidin-lyrics/
https://genius.com/Planxty-bean-phaidin-lyrics
https://www.bitesize.irish/gachla/sing/paidin/
https://archive.culturalequity.org/field-work/ireland-1951-and-1953/oughterard-151/bean-phaidin-pats-wife
https://www.cincinnati.com/story/entertainment/music/2016/03/17/celtic-woman-stories-behind-songs/81879448/
https://www.irishcentral.com/opinion/others/bean-phaidin-paddys-wife-or-i-wanna-be-paddys-girl-226344931-238256661
https://www.askaboutireland.ie/learning-zone/secondary-students/music/popular-songs-and-recordings/bean-phaidin/
http://www.rosenlake.net/er/irish/bean-phaidin.html
http://www.tablyricfm.com/artist-Orla-Fallon-tab-Lyric-fm
https://www.amazon.com/Lore-%C3%93rla-Fallon/dp/B08D7ZS6ZY
https://johnspillane.ie/shop/irish-songs-we-learned-at-school-ar-ais-aris/

Irish folk songs